Artem Miroshnychenko (born 9 November 1978) is a Ukrainian former professional football midfielder.

Miroshnychenko started his football career at amateur level playing for the second team of FC Obolon Kyiv.

References

External links
 
 

1978 births
Living people
Ukrainian footballers
FC Obolon-Brovar Kyiv players
FC Obolon-2 Kyiv players
FC Yevropa Pryluky players
FC Yednist Plysky players
Ukrainian Premier League players
Association football midfielders